Gholamhossein Mosaheb (October 13, 1910 – 1979) was an Iranian mathematician and logician whose works have been praised by other scholars such as Iraj Afshar and Najaf Daryabandari. Being fluent in Persian, Arabic, French and English, he studied in Iran, France and England; and received his PhD from Cambridge University. He was the founder of Mosaheb Institute of Mathematics, Teacher Training University and was the director of the Institute of Mathematics of Kharazmi University from 1972-1974.

During the 1950s, when Persian scientific typography was flourishing, Mosaheb invented a left slanted right-to-left font style that he named the Iranic font. This term is still commonly used by typographers in Iran, often as a general term for any left slanted font.

In 1955, Mosaheb's Madkhale Manteghe Soorat (Introduction to Formal Logic) was the first scholarly writing in mathematical logic to be published in Iran. This work was given a positive review in 1957 by L. A. Zadeh in the Journal of Symbolic Logic. Mosaheb's most famous work in non-mathematical society is as the author of The Persian Encyclopedia, written in the Persian language and consisting of 3 volumes. His methods of organizing and categorizing are still in use. The 1996 publication of The Persian Encyclopedia gave credited authorship to himself, Ahmad Aram and Mahmoud Mosaheb.

On June 28, 2009 it was announced that the 100th book released from the Society for the Appreciation of Cultural works and Dignitaries had been allocated to the life, scientific and cultural works of the late Gholamhossien Mosaheb. This tribute is written by Pegah Hajjan. In it are many of Mosaheb's published works including an article entitled The First Trigonometry Book, as well as appraisals from other scholars.

He is the founder of the Institute of Mathematical Research (IMR) which is still known as one of the most important Iranian mathematical centers. The Institute of Mathematical Research started its work in October 1965 under the direction of Mosaheb, as a semi-independent institute affiliated with Tarbiat Moaalem University. His sister Shams ol-Moluk was one of the first two women appointed to the Senate.

References

External links
همنشین بهار: یادی از دکتر غلامحسین مصاحب و فرزند ِ شریفش دایره المعارف
نخستين فرهنگ‌نامه‌ي نوين ايران 
مقدمه‌ي مصاحب بر دايره‌المعارف فارسي 
پديدآورندگان دايره‌المعارف فارسي 
 Institute of Mathematical Research  

20th-century Iranian mathematicians
20th-century Iranian inventors
Iranian encyclopedists
1910 births
1979 deaths
Alumni of the University of Cambridge